The Fitzroy Football Club is an Australian rules football club currently competing in the Victorian Amateur Football Association (VAFA). Formed in 1883 to represent the inner-Melbourne municipality of Fitzroy, the club was a member of the Victorian Football Association (VFA), before becoming a foundation member of the breakaway Victorian Football League (VFL/AFL) in 1897.

Fitzroy won a total of eight VFL premierships, of which seven (1898, 1899, 1904, 1905, 1913, 1916 and 1922) were won whilst they were nicknamed the Maroons and one (1944) as the Gorillas. The decision of the club to change its nickname to the Lions in 1957 coincided with what history now records as the beginning of decades of poor on-field performance and financial losses that eventually resulted in the club being placed into administration, ultimately leaving the AFL at the end of the 1996 season. That year the club's AFL playing operations merged with the Brisbane Bears to form the Brisbane Lions. It eventually came out of administration in 1998, and proceeded to commence playing in the VAFA in 2009.

Fitzroy largely resumed its original VFL/AFL identity through its continued use of their 1975–1996 VFL/AFL jumper, their club song and their 1884–1966 home ground at the Brunswick Street Oval. For a brief time, it experimented in partnerships with other semi-professional and amateur clubs before incorporating the Fitzroy Reds (formerly University Reds) to play in the Victorian Amateur Football Association. They began in the D1 section of the VAFA in 2009 and now, after having been promoted three times (2009, 2012, 2018), play in the Premier 'B Division'.

History

Early years 
The Fitzroy Football Club was formed at a meeting at the Brunswick Hotel on 26 September 1883, at a time when Melbourne's population was rapidly increasing. The Victorian Football Association (VFA) made changes to their rules, allowing Fitzroy to join as the seventh club in 1884, playing in the maroon and blue colours of the local Normanby Junior Football Club.

VFA 

They quickly became one of the most successful clubs, drawing large crowds to their home at the Brunswick Street Oval in Edinburgh Gardens, and consistently in the top four and winning the VFA premiership in 1895.

Fitzroy's season-by-season records throughout its thirteen seasons at VFA level are given below. (Under VFA rules at the time, only goals were counted to the total team score).

VFL 

In 1897, Fitzroy were one of the eight clubs who broke away from the VFA to form the Victorian Football League (VFL).

Despite winning only four games and finishing sixth in the first season, the Maroons, as they were then known, won the premiership the following year, winning the VFL's first "Grand Final" against Essendon. Fitzroy was the most successful club in the first 10 years of the VFL, winning four premierships and finishing runners-up on three occasions. Despite internal problems after the 1906 season which led to the players and set the club back for several seasons, the 1913 team won the flag after winning 16 of 18 matches in the home and away season, earning the nickname "Unbeatables". In contrast, the 1916 Fitzroy team only won 2 home and away matches and finished last in a competition reduced by the effects of World War I to four teams. All four teams qualified for the finals, and Fitzroy won their next three games to win one of the strangest VFL premierships.

Between the wars 

The Maroons won their seventh premiership in 1922, a season which included four very rough games against eventual runners-up Collingwood. However, after this their fortunes waned, and they did not make the finals at all from 1925 to 1942. During this time, highlights for the club were individual achievements of their players, especially Haydn Bunton Sr. Originally a source of controversy, lured to Fitzroy with an illegal £222 payment, and subsequently not allowed to play in the 1930 season, Bunton became one of the game's greatest players, winning three Brownlow Medals while at Fitzroy. Brownlow Medals were also won by Wilfred Smallhorn and Dinny Ryan, while Jack Moriarty set many goalkicking records. It was during this time that the Maroons became known as the Gorillas.

Post-war 
Football was less affected by World War II than it had been in 1916, and by 1944 was starting to return to its normal level. It was in this year, under captain-coach Fred Hughson, that the Gorillas won their eighth VFL flag against Richmond in front of a capacity crowd at Junction Oval.

However, it was also to be their last senior premiership, as the club, which became known as the Lions in 1957, entered one of the least successful periods any VFL/AFL club has had. The club finished in the bottom three 11 times in the 1960s and 1970s, including three wooden spoons in four years between 1963 and 1966. The club won only a single game between 1963 and 1964 – known as the Miracle Match when it defeated eventual premiers  in Round 10, 1963 – but its 1964 season was winless, and as of 2021 stands as the only winless season by any club since 1950. Nevertheless, the club continued to produce great individual players over this period, including Brownlow Medallists Allan Ruthven and Kevin Murray.

By the mid-1960s, Fitzroy's traditional home ground, the Brunswick Street Oval was in a state of disrepair. However, the ground managers were the Fitzroy Cricket Club. The Football Club had to pay the Cricket Club to use the ground. Despite pressure from the Lions and other VFL clubs, the Cricket Club refused to make the needed upgrades. The Fitzroy City Council, despite repeated requests from the Football Club, also refused to help, even rejecting the idea of a $400,000 loan to Fitzroy Football Club, and a 40-year lease of the ground so they could make some repairs.

The football club put forward various ideas to try and change the situation, including the amalgamation of the Football and Cricket Clubs to form one club as in the manner of the Carlton Social Club. The Cricket Club held the liquor licence and managed the ground, and it was thought that a combined club could more efficiently manage funds. With a stake in the ground, the football club could have better agitated for improvements to the ground by sourcing funds from other organisations such as the VFL. However, the Cricket Club rejected the idea outright. The club also considered leaving Brunswick Street, and in 1962 it appealed to the Preston Council for a 40-year lease of the Preston City Oval, which was rejected.

It was only when the Council Health Officer condemned the change rooms at the Brunswick Street Oval in 1966 and negotiations broke down between the council, (who offered a 21-year lease) and the football club, that the Fitzroy Football Club was forced to find another ground. They had held discussions with the Northcote and Preston VFA clubs and also had approached the Heidelberg Council about relocating to the Olympic Training Ground. From 1967 to 1969, the club moved their home games to Carlton's Princes Park while keeping their training and administration at the Brunswick Street Oval. Further problems with the Cricket Club and the high cost of rent imposed by Carlton saw Fitzroy move to the Junction Oval in 1970, where they had a short-lived promising start to the decade. This was followed by a night premiership win in 1978 and a then-League-record score of 36.22 (238) and greatest winning margin of 190 points in 1979. However, Fitzroy's most significant post-war success was in the early '80s, when the Lions made the finals four times, culminating in a preliminary final appearance in 1986. This success occurred under the coaching of Robert Walls and David Parkin, with players such as 1981 Brownlow Medallist Bernie Quinlan, Ron Alexander, Garry Wilson, Gary Pert and Paul Roos.

The club was evicted from Junction Oval at the end of 1984 after a fifteen-year tenure, and entered another nomadic period of existence.

Merger years 

Talk of the death of the club due to financial troubles occurred as early as 1986. In 1989 the directors agreed to amalgamation with equally troubled Footscray to form the Fitzroy Bulldogs, but a fightback from Footscray supporters, in which almost two million dollars was raised in three weeks, averted the merger. At other times, joining with Melbourne or relocating to Brisbane was suggested. As well as trying several fund-raising ventures, the Lions experimented with playing four home matches in Tasmania in 1991 and 1992 to avoid a takeover bid by the Brisbane Bears. but lost money in the process. In 1994, the club moved its home matches to Western Oval, its fourth match-day home ground in 10 years. Amid uncertainties about the financial future of the club, its on-field performances continued to deteriorate, to the point where the Lions finished last by a long way in 1995 and 1996, winning just three matches in those seasons combined. With financial and on–field performance issues plaguing the club and with  due to enter the AFL in 1997 requiring a team to either merge or fold to make way for them, the writing for Fitzroy was on the wall.

On 28 June 1996, the Nauru Insurance Company, a creditor of the Fitzroy Football Club, appointed Michael Brennan to administer the affairs of the Fitzroy Football Club to ensure a loan of A$1.25 million was to be repaid. During the 1996 season, there were fears that the club would collapse in mid-season due to its lack of cash. This was averted when the AFL guaranteed funds to Fitzroy to allow the club to continue in the competition for the remainder of 1996.

During the final years, the Fitzroy Football Club had been in merger discussions with several teams, but discussions were most advanced with North Melbourne. By the beginning of July 1996, the club had agreed to arrangements to become the North Fitzroy Kangaroos Football Club. Negotiations for elements such as club colours, guernsey and song were to be settled by the morning of 4 July by the Fitzroy board.

However, later that afternoon the administrator of Fitzroy who had been appointed to temporarily replace the Fitzroy board agreed to merge the club with the equally strapped Brisbane Bears, with the agreement of the AFL commission and a majority vote of the AFL's constituent clubs. The new club was to be based in Brisbane as the Brisbane Lions, playing at The Gabba in the Brisbane suburb of Woolloongabba. The arrangement ensured that all creditors were repaid, at least eight Fitzroy players were to be selected by the Brisbane Lions before the 1996 National Draft and three Fitzroy representatives were to be on the new club's 11-member board. None of the three Fitzroy representatives, Laurie Serafini, David Lucas and Ken Levy, chosen by the Brisbane Bears to serve on the Brisbane Lions board were Fitzroy directors at that time.

Those involved have different opinions on why the merger with North Melbourne was rejected, despite negotiations being so far advanced and indeed concluded on the morning of 4 July. The other AFL club presidents rejected the North Melbourne-Fitzroy merger by a vote of 14–1. It was commonly thought, and claimed by then Richmond president Leon Daphne, that an all-Victorian merge would create a superteam with on-field and off-field strength out of all proportion to the rest of the league. Not only would North Melbourne go on to the 1996 premiership, the merged team had proposed to take a 50-player senior list into the 1997 season. This is compared with the Brisbane Lions bid, which proposed a 44-player senior list for 1997, and did not have the potential off-field strength of an all-Victorian merge. Then North Melbourne CEO Greg Miller has accused the AFL of contriving the two bids in this manner to manufacture a result which would fulfil its strategic direction to strengthen the game in Queensland. Additionally, then North Melbourne vice-president Peter de Rauch believes that his club's decision not to include Fitzroy president Dyson Hore-Lacy on the board of the merged club was a catalyst for the temporary unravelling of negotiations between the clubs, allowing the appointment of the administrator and keeping the Brisbane Bears involved in the merger negotiations.

During this time, senior coach Mick Nunan resigned after Fitzroy's game against Essendon on 6 July and was replaced by Alan McConnell for his second stint in just twelve months. With eight rounds to go until the end of the season, Fitzroy's on field performances continued to deteriorate to the point where the team was thrashed week in, week out. In Round 21, 48,884 people attended the Melbourne Cricket Ground (MCG) on 25 August 1996 for Fitzroy's last ever game in Melbourne as part of the AFL competition. They witnessed the Lions being defeated by 151 points, the second greatest loss in the club's history: Richmond 28.19 (187) defeated Fitzroy 5.6 (36). The club played its final VFL/AFL game the following week on 1 September against  at Subiaco Oval, losing by 86 points.

Post-merger 

On-field
The original Fitzroy Football Club came out of administration after the merger of the playing operations in late 1998. The shareholders voted to continue the club, and Fitzroy then developed a partnership with the Coburg Lions in the VFL. Coburg were known as the Coburg-Fitzroy Lions for just over a season (from August 1999 until the end of 2000). However, when Coburg entered into an affiliation with the AFL's Richmond Football Club, the Fitzroy connection was abandoned.

Fitzroy began a sponsorship arrangement with the Fitzroy Reds (formerly University Reds) in the Victorian Amateur Football Association and the Fitzroy Junior Football Club in the Yarra Junior Football League. Both wear the old Fitzroy jumper, play the old theme song, and play from Brunswick Street Oval in the heart of Fitzroy. In December 2008, at the instigation of the then Fitzroy (University) Reds president Craig Little, the University Reds Football Club (known as the 'Fitzroy' Reds from 1997) transferred all its assets to the Fitzroy Football Club (formed 1883). The university (Fitzroy) Reds terminated its membership of the VAFA and was wound up as an incorporated company and football club. By special dispensation from the VAFA, the Fitzroy Football Club then replaced the Fitzroy [University] Reds in D1 of the VAFA from the 2009 season, fielding a senior and reserves side, as well as two Under-19 sides and a Club 18 side. All the teams were made up mainly of Fitzroy Reds personnel. Dyson Hore-Lacy, chairman of Fitzroy in the AFL in 1996, automatically became chairman of the Club in the VAFA.

Fitzroy lost in the VAFA D1 Grand Final to Rupertswood in 2009, but as a Grand Finalist was promoted to C-Grade for the 2010 season. At the beginning of the 2011 season, Fitzroy appointed Tim Bell as their new senior coach following the resignation of Simon Taylor. Tim Bell resigned for personal reasons at the end of 2011 and assistant coach Michael Pickering, a former AFL player with the Richmond and Melbourne Football Clubs was appointed as coach for the 2012 season. Having reached the Premier C Grand Final at the end of 2012 season, Fitzroy was promoted to Premier B for season 2013 which coincided with the club's 130th birthday.

In 2015 the club initiated in a partnership with the Australian Catholic University to start fielding a women's team in the VWFL under the name of Fitzroy-ACU. They played their debut season in the same year.
The interest grew after the first year of women's Fitzroy footy, growing numbers within the women's league. This enabled the club to enter another women's team into the VWFL, in the North West division.
Both teams were hoping to make finals in 2016.

In 2018, Fitzroy won both the VAFA Premier C and the VAFA Premier C reserves competitions.

Relationship with Brisbane Lions
Fitzroy FC Ltd improved its relationship with the Brisbane Lions in the ten years from 1999 to 2009. In that time Brisbane acknowledged the two parent clubs for the merger with the letters BBFFC printed below the back of the neck of the club's guernseys from 2002. The Fitzroy Reds played the curtain-raiser at the MCG when the Brisbane Lions met the Collingwood Magpies in the AFL Heritage Round of 2003. Brisbane also now wears a version of Fitzroy's AFL guernsey with red instead of maroon in most matches played in Victoria, consistent with Fitzroy's most recent colours.

Relationships between Fitzroy and Brisbane were strained in late 2009, when Brisbane announced that it was adopting a new logo for season 2010 and beyond, which Fitzroy Football Club believed contravened Section 7.2 c) of the merger agreement. The new logo, a lion's head facing forward, replaced the former Fitzroy logo of a passant lion with a football. On 22 December 2009, Fitzroy lodged a Statement of Claim with the Supreme Court of Victoria, seeking an order that the Brisbane Lions be restrained from using as its logo, the new logo or any other logo other than 'the Fitzroy lion logo'. On 15 July 2010, the two clubs reached a settlement, agreeing that the Fitzroy logo symbolically represents the historic merger between the Bears and Fitzroy and the first 13 years of the Brisbane Lions competing in the AFL, and that Brisbane would use both the old and new logos alongside each other in an official capacity (e.g. on letterheads, marketing, etc.), with the old logo to be phased out altogether after 2024 (or 2017 in the case of the Brisbane Lions website). Brisbane returned to using the old logo on its playing guernseys from 2015, but the new logo will remain for corporate purposes.

Sine 2015 a one club approach has been taken from both the Brisbane Lions and Fitzroy. The Lions sponsor a male and female Fitzroy player each year, conduct coaching workshops for Fitzroy, and frequently invite the Fitzroy juniors to form a guard of honour for Victorian games. With many Fitzroy people having served on the Brisbane Lions board, the long history of Fitzroy continues in each of these iterations of the club.

Sponsorship

Honours

Individual honours

Brownlow Medal winners
 Haydn Bunton Sr. – 1931, 1932, 1935
 Wilfred Smallhorn – 1933
 Dinny Ryan – 1936
 Allan Ruthven – 1950
 Kevin Murray – 1969
 Bernie Quinlan – 1981 (co-winner with Barry Round)

Coleman Medal for leading goalkicker
 Jimmy Freake – 1915
 Jack Moriarty – 1924
 Bernie Quinlan – 1983, 1984

Leigh Matthews Trophy winners
 Paul Roos (1986)

Best and fairest award winners
See Fitzroy FC honour roll for list of winners 1884–1996.

Home venues

VFA

 1884–1896 Brunswick Street Oval

VFL/AFL

Under

 1897–1966 Brunswick Street Oval
 1967–1969, 1987–1993 Princes Park
 1970–1984 Junction Oval
 1985–1986 Victoria Park
 1994–1996 Whitten Oval

VAFA

 2009–present Brunswick Street Oval

Nicknames

Current nicknames
The Lions (1957–present)
Fitzroy never won either a VFL or AFL premiership as the Lions.
The Redders (2009–present)
The Roys (unknown–present)

Former nicknames
The Maroons 1883–1938 (Fitzroy won 8 premierships—1 VFA and 7 VFL—as the Maroons.)
The Gorillas 1938–1957 (Fitzroy won 1 premiership as the Gorillas, their final one, in 1944.

VFL-AFL Club records

Colours
Throughout its history, Fitzroy had multiple colours and kits, in conjunction with the changing of its nicknames.

Club song

The Fitzroy Lions Football Club song was sung to the tune of "La Marseillaise", the French national anthem.Bill Stephen wrote the lyrics on an end-of-season football trip to Perth in 1952.

We are the boys from old Fitzroy,
we wear the colours maroon and blue,
we will always fight for victory,
and we'll always see it through,
win or lose, we do or die,
in defeat, we always try,
Fitzroy, Fitzroy,
the club we hold so dear,
premiers, we'll be this year!

Team of the Century

See also 
 1963 Miracle Match
 Brisbane Lions – for the merged club of Brisbane Lions Football Club 
 Fitzroy Bulldogs – for the proposed merger with the Footscray Football Club
 Fitzroy FC honour roll – for coaches, captains, leading goalkickers and team position.
 List of Fitzroy Football Club coaches
 List of Fitzroy Football Club players
 North Fitzroy Kangaroos – for the proposed merger with the North Melbourne Football Club
 Proposed VFL/AFL clubs – for all of the proposed mergers for Fitzroy

Bibliography

 Fitzroy Football Club: Silver Jubilee, Fitzroy City Press, (Friday, 18 September 1908), p.3.

References

External links 

 
 "In Defeat We'll Always Try" – Radio National documentary on the death of the Fitzroy Lions
 Fitzroy history
 "Around the Grounds" – Web Documentary – Brunswick Street

 
Australian rules football clubs established in 1883
Former VFL/AFL clubs
Australian rules football clubs in Melbourne
Former Victorian Football League clubs
1883 establishments in Australia
Sport in the City of Yarra
Fitzroy, Victoria